Pipe cutting, or pipe profiling, is a mechanized industrial process that removes material from pipe or tube to create a desired profile.  Typical profiles include straight cuts, mitres, saddles and midsection holes.  These complex cuts are usually required to allow a tight fit between two parts that are to be joined via arc welding.

Hot cutting
Hot cutting is performed by means of a thermal torch (plasma or oxyfuel) and is mounted to the last axis of a multi-axis machine.  The axes of the multi-axis machine are powered by electric motors and are synchronized to create a path for the torch and pipe that yield a desired profile.  The synchronization of axes is accomplished either mechanically, via cams, levers and gears, or electronically, via microprocessors and controllers.

Cold cutting
Where the high temperatures and sources of ignition required by hot cutting are not desirable, air- or hydraulically-powered pipe cutting machines are used. These comprise a clamshell or chain-mounted cutting head holding a tool steel and feed mechanism which advances the tool a set amount per revolution round the pipe. Tools may be styled to cut and/or prepare the bevel for welding in a single or multiple passes.

Popular in offshore, pipe processing, ship building, pressure vessel, structural and mechanical contracting manufacturing because of the complex cuts and profiles typical required in their respective industries. Some common pipe cutting applications are: pipe work, offshore jackets, industrial steel structures, stadiums, cranes, nozzles, and pipe laying stingers.

References

Piping